The 2011 All-Big 12 Conference football team consists of American football players chosen as All-Big 12 Conference players for the 2011 Big 12 Conference football season.  The conference recognizes two official All-Big 12 selectors: (1) the Big 12 conference coaches selected separate offensive and defensive units and named first- and second-team players (the "Coaches" team); and (2) a panel of sports writers and broadcasters covering the Big 12 also selected offensive and defensive units and named first- and second-team players (the "Media" team).

Offensive selections

Quarterbacks
 Robert Griffin III, Baylor (Coaches-1; Media-1)
 Brandon Weeden, Oklahoma State (Coaches-2; Media-2)

Running backs
 Henry Josey, Missouri (Coaches-1; Media-1)
 Joseph Randle, Oklahoma State (Coaches-2; Media-1)
 Terrance Ganaway, Baylor (Coaches-1; Media-2)
 Cyrus Gray, Texas A&M (Coaches-2; Media-2)

Fullbacks
 Trey Millard, Oklahoma (Coaches-1)
 Kye Staley, Oklahoma State (Coaches-2)

Centers
 Grant Garner, Oklahoma State (Coaches-1; Media-1)
 Gabe Ikard, Oklahoma (Coaches-1, Media-1)
 Philip Blake, Baylor (Coaches-1; Media-2)

Guards
 Kelechi Osemele, Iowa State (Coaches-1; Media-1)
 Robert T. Griffin, Baylor (Coaches-2)
 Jeremiah Hatch, Kansas (Coaches-2)
 Hayworth Hicks, Iowa State (Coaches-2)
 Austin Wuebbels, Missouri (Media-2)

Tackles
 Levy Adcock, Oklahoma State (Coaches-1; Media-1)
 Luke Joeckel, Texas A&M (Coaches-2; Media-1)
 LaAdrian Waddle, Texas Tech (Coaches-2; Media-2)
 Clyde Aufner, Kansas State (Media-2)
 Zach Hanson, Kansas State (Coaches-2)
 David Snow, Texas (Media-2)

Tight ends
 Michael Egnew, Missouri (Coaches-1; Media-1)
 James Hanna, Oklahoma (Coaches-2; Media-2 (tie))
 Adam James, Texas Tech (Media-2 (tie))

Receivers
 Justin Blackmon, Oklahoma State (Coaches-1; Media-1)
 Kendall Wright, Baylor (Coaches-1; Media-1)
 Ryan Broyles, Oklahoma (Coaches-1; Media-2)
 Ryan Swope, Texas A&M (Coaches-2; Media-2)
 Josh Cooper, Oklahoma State (Coaches-2)
 Kenny Stills, Oklahoma (Coaches-2)

Defensive selections

Defensive linemen
 Frank Alexander, Oklahoma (Coaches-1; Media-1)
 Jamie Blatnick, Oklahoma State (Coaches-1; Media-1)
 Alex Okafor, Texas (Coaches-1; Media-1)
 Ronnell Lewis, Oklahoma (Coaches-1; Media-2)
 Dominique Hamilton, Missouri (Media-1)
 Ray Kibble, Kansas State (Coaches-1)
 Jackson Jeffcoat, Texas (Coaches-2; Media-2)
 Kheeston Randall, Texas (Coaches-2; Media-2)
 Jacquies Smith, Missouri (Coaches-2; Media-2)
 Nicolas Jean-Baptiste, Baylor (Coaches-2)
 Tony Jerod-Eddie, Texas A&M (Coaches-2)

Linebackers
 Emmanuel Acho, Texas (Coaches-1; Media-1)
 Arthur Brown, Kansas State (Coaches-1; Media-1)
 Jake Knott, Iowa State (Coaches-2; Media-1)
 A. J. Klein, Iowa State (Coaches-1; Media-2)
 Travis Lewis, Oklahoma (Coaches-2; Media-2)
 Sean Porter, Texas A&M (Media-1)
 Steven Johnson, Kansas (Media-2)
 Luke Lambert, Missouri (Media-2)
 Keenan Robinson, Texas (Coaches-2)

Defensive backs
 Brodrick Brown, Oklahoma State (Coaches-1; Media-1)
 Jamell Fleming, Oklahoma (Coaches-1; Media-1)
 E. J. Gaines, Missouri (Media-1; Coaches-2)
 Nigel Malone, Kansas State (Coaches-1; Media-2)
 Markelle Martin, Oklahoma State (Coaches-1; Media-2)
 Carrington Byndom, Texas (Media-1)
 Kenny Vaccaro, Texas (Coaches-1)
 Leonard Johnson, Iowa State (Media-2; Coaches-2)
 Justin Gilbert, Oklahoma State (Media-2)
 Tysyn Hartman, Kansas State (Coaches-2)
 Demontre Hurst, Oklahoma (Coaches-2)
 Quandre Diggs, Texas (Coaches-2)

Special teams

Kickers
 Randy Bullock, Texas A&M (Coaches-2; Media-1)
 Quinn Sharp, Oklahoma State (Coaches-1)
 Justin Tucker, Texas (Media-2)

Punters
 Quinn Sharp, Oklahoma State (Coaches-1; Media-1)
 Trey Barrow, Missouri (Coaches-2; Media-2)

All-purpose / Return specialists
 Collin Klein, Kansas State (Media-1)
 Fozzy Whittaker, Texas (Coaches-1)
 Tyler Lockett, Kansas State (Coaches-2; Media-2)

Key
Bold = selected as a first-team player by both the coaches and media panel

Coaches = selected by Big 12 Conference coaches

Media = selected by a media panel

See also
2011 College Football All-America Team

References

All-Big 12 Conference
All-Big 12 Conference football teams